The Depretis I government of Italy held office from 25 March 1876 until 25 December 1877, a total of 650 days, or 1 year and 9 months.

Government parties
The government was composed by the following parties:

Composition

References

Italian governments
1876 establishments in Italy